Phalaenopsis × valentinii is a species of orchid native to peninsular Malaysia. It is a natural hybrid of Phalaenopsis violacea and Phalaenopsis cornu-cervi.

Taxonomy
It has been placed within the section Stauroglottis by  Robert Allen Rolfe. Its hybrid nature was unknown in this placement.

References 

valentinii
Orchid hybrids
Hybrid plants
Plant nothospecies
Interspecific plant hybrids